The Sisters of Christian Charity (S.C.C.), officially called Sisters of Christian Charity, Daughters of the Blessed Virgin Mary of the Immaculate Conception, is a Roman Catholic papal congregation of consecrated Religious Sisters. They were founded in Paderborn, Germany, on 21 August 1849 by Blessed Pauline von Mallinckrodt (b. 3 June 1817, at Minden, Westphalia; d. 30 April 1881), sister of the highly regarded German politician Hermann von Mallinckrodt. Their original mission was for the care of the blind. Today, their main mission is teaching in Catholic schools and healthcare. Unlike some Religious Sisters, Sisters of Christian Charity are required to wear a traditional religious habit.

History
The institute had attained great success throughout Germany when, in 1873, its members were forced into exile by the persecution of the Kulturkampf. Some went to South America, where there are now many flourishing communities. Others emigrated to New Orleans, United States, where, in April 1873, they founded a house and took charge of a parochial school. Mother Pauline followed shortly after and established a new provincial mother-house, at Wilkes-Barre, Pennsylvania. The congregation was confirmed on 7 February 1888 by Pope Leo XIII.

The foundress of the congregation, Pauline von Mallinckrodt, was beatified by Pope John Paul II in Rome on 14 April 1985. The cause for the canonization of Blessed Pauline is currently being examined by the Vatican. The current Superior General of the congregation is Sister Maria Del Rosario Castro, S.C.C.

The Sisters opened houses in the Archdioceses of Baltimore, Chicago, Cincinnati, Detroit, Newark, New York, Philadelphia, St. Louis, and Saint Paul, and in the Dioceses of Albany, Belleville, Brooklyn, Harrisburg, Paterson, Sioux City, and Syracuse.

In 1927, the North American Province was divided into a North American Eastern Province and a North American Western Province. The motherhouse for the Eastern province is located in Mendham, New Jersey, and the motherhouse of the Western province is located in Wilmette, Illinois. In 1961, the Assumption College for Sisters was founded at the motherhouse in New Jersey, for the education of Religious Sisters, especially those from developing nations.

In 1975 a group of members separated and founded the Sisters of the Living Word.

Apostolate

By 2010, Sisters of Christian Charity were present in Germany, Italy, the United States, Chile, Argentina, Uruguay, Bolivia, and the Philippines.

The Sisters of Christian Charity sponsor Assumption College for Sisters, a two-year Roman Catholic women's college on the campus of Morris Catholic High School. Founded in 1953 through an affiliation with  Seton Hall University, Assumption specializes in theological studies and the liberal arts. It is the last remaining sisters' college, or college primarily designed to educate nuns, in the United States.

References

External links
Sisters of Christian Charity
Sisters of Christian Charity, Eastern Province
Sisters of Christian Charity, Western Province

Catholic female orders and societies
Religious organizations established in 1849
Catholic religious institutes established in the 19th century
1849 establishments in Prussia